Ray Brown (born 16 February 1943) is an Australian wrestler. He competed in the men's freestyle featherweight at the 1964 Summer Olympics.

References

1943 births
Living people
Australian male sport wrestlers
Olympic wrestlers of Australia
Wrestlers at the 1964 Summer Olympics
Place of birth missing (living people)
Commonwealth Games medallists in wrestling
Commonwealth Games bronze medallists for Australia
Wrestlers at the 1974 British Commonwealth Games
Medallists at the 1974 British Commonwealth Games